Kumbia Kings Live is a live album and tenth album by Mexican-American cumbia group A.B. Quintanilla y Los Kumbia Kings and the first live album by Mexican-American musician A.B. Quintanilla. It was released on April 4, 2006, by EMI Latin. The concert took place in Monterrey, Nuevo León, Mexico. The song "Pachuco" is a studio recording that was released as a single to promote the album.

The concert was released on video in DVD format in conjunction with the album.

Track listing

DVD

Track listing
 "Intro"
 "Baila Esta Kumbia"
 "Army Chant/Nino's Hair"
 "Boom Boom"
 "Te Quiero a Ti"
 "Pangie and Pollo"
 "Desde Que No Estás Aquí"
 "The Power of Kings"
 "Insomnio"
 "Mr. Green Eyes"
 "No Tengo Dinero"
 "You Thought You Knew P-Dub"
 "Sabes a Chocolate"
 "I'm Tired of This Song"
 "Na Na Na (Dulce Niña)"
 "My Favorite Song"
 "Mi Gente"
 "Tattoos"
 "Fuiste Mala"
 "Azúcar"
 "Unsung Heroes"
 "Reggae Kumbia"
 "Nando Can Cook"
 "Fuego"
 "Shhh!"

Sales and certifications

References

2006 live albums
Kumbia Kings albums
A. B. Quintanilla albums
Albums produced by A.B. Quintanilla
Albums produced by Cruz Martínez
EMI Latin live albums
Spanish-language live albums
Cumbia albums